Frank Cummins may refer to:
 Frank Cummins (Kilkenny hurler) (born 1947), Irish hurler for Kilkenny
 Frank Cummins (Dublin hurler) (1925–1967), Irish hurler for Dublin
 Frank Cummins (cricketer) (1906–1966), Australian cricketer
 Frank Cummins (footballer) (1896–1971), Australian rules footballer

See also
 Francis Cummins (born 1976), English rugby league coach and former player
 Frank Cummings (1891–1954), Australian Olympic rower